Meigs County is the name of two counties in the United States:

 Meigs County, Ohio 
 Meigs County, Tennessee